Mecynoceras is a genus of Late Devonian oncocerids included in the Poterioceratidae, a family of subcircular to compressed exogastric cyrtocones without a hyponomic sinus.

Mecynoceras has a compressed, gibbous cyrtoconic shell. The venter, especially of the chambered phragmocone is convex in profile; the body chamber long and tubular. Septa are transverse, close spaced; the siphuncle large, subcentral, with actinosiphonate deposits.

Cyrtogomphus, Lysagoroceras, and Poterioceras are among related genera.

References

 Walter C. Sweet, 1964. Nautiloidea-Oncocerida. Treatise on Invertebrate Paleontology, Part K. Geological Society of America.
 Mecynoceras Fossilworks entry.

Prehistoric nautiloid genera
Oncocerida